Isaac Twum (born 14 February 1998) is a Ghanaian professional footballer who plays for Norwegian club Sogndal, as a midfielder.

Club career
Twum began his career in his native Ghana, playing for Heart of Lions and International Allies. On 1 December 2017, Start announced the signing of Twum.

Career statistics

International career
After appearing for Ghana U17 and Ghana U20, Twum made his senior debut for Ghana in a 3–0 win against Saudi Arabia on 10 October 2017. Twum was captain of the Ghanaian team that won the 2017 WAFU Cup of Nations, being named Most Valuable Player of the tournament in the process.

References

1998 births
Living people
People from Eastern Region (Ghana)
Ghanaian footballers
Heart of Lions F.C. players
International Allies F.C. players
IK Start players
Ghana international footballers
Ghana Premier League players
Eliteserien players
Association football midfielders
Ghanaian expatriate footballers
Ghanaian expatriate sportspeople in Norway
Expatriate footballers in Norway
Ghana under-20 international footballers
Mjøndalen IF players